Evening Leader is the name of several newspapers. It may refer to:

Chester Evening Leader in the United Kingdom
Wrexham Evening Leader in the United Kingdom
Flintshire Evening Leader in the United Kingdom
The Leader (Corning), formerly called The Evening Leader, in Corning, New York, United States
The Evening Leader, in St. Marys, Ohio, United States